Transfermarkt is a German-based  website owned by Axel Springer SE that has footballing information, such as scores, results, statistics, transfer news, and fixtures. According to the IVW, it is in the top 25 most visited German websites, and one of the largest sport websites after kicker.de.

The website has scores, results, transfer news, fixtures, and player values. Despite the player values, along with some other facts, being estimates, researchers from the Centre for Economic Performance have found that the "rumours" of player transfers are largely accurate.

These estimated player values are usually updated every few months, considering how the association football market works, these estimates might be slightly lower or higher than what a players' current form and therefore current value might suggest.

History
The website was founded in May 2000, by Matthias Seidel to track players and transfer targets for SV Werder Bremen before expanding to other teams. The website initially focused on players, but gradually expanded to include managers, agents, and other staff. In 2008, Axel Springer publishing house acquired a 51% share in the website. Seidel kept the other 49% of the shares. The English-language version started in 2009.

On 19 May 2014, a relaunch took place for the so-called update to 'version 4'. In the course of this update there were both server-technical as well as data-legal issues, as private data was visible to other users for an indefinite period of time. For 48 hours the site had only a very limited availability, resulting in multiple complaints on Facebook. The biggest criticisms from users was the confusing new design. As a result, Transfermarkt.de publicly apologized for the incidents and issues that were caused during the relaunch.

, the website has 39 million unique monthly visitors and 680,000 registered users.

References

External link

Association football websites
German sport websites
Internet properties established in 2000
2000 establishments in Germany